British country clothing or English country clothing is the traditional attire worn by men and women in rural Britain; it is the choice of clothing when taking part in outdoor sports such as equestrian pursuits, shooting or fishing and during general outdoor activity, such as walking, picnicking, or gardening. It is also worn at events such as horse races, country weddings, beer festivals and country fairs.

The form of dress although worn throughout Britain is mostly associated with England and is sometimes considered a historical form of dress or national costume, often worn to represent the English gentleman and lady. It is still considered countryside leisure wear and due to the durable, practical, comfortable and fashionable style, some people choose to use elements of country clothing for general usage in Britain.

History
During the 19th and early 20th centuries, what is regarded as traditional country clothing was a popular choice for wealthy people living in the British countryside as well as those who travelled there for leisure. Members of the British upper classes would go to the countryside for sporting events organized by the owners of English country houses if they did not own a country house themselves, and therefore they required practical and durable clothing. Today many of the original tailors who produced some of the first country style clothing still exist; and some have been granted a royal warrant; where it was once basic and usually just worn in the country, the popularity of the style has led to productions on the high street, as well as variations in the colours used as opposed to just natural. 

Many elements of British country clothing have even been used by designers to develop styles which are suitable for everyday use; today people also choose to use elements of country clothing mixed with modern designs such as a tweed jacket with a denim trouser. It has also been influential in the development of preppy and Ivy League styles of dress in the United States and Canada.

Country attire

Headwear
The flat cap, Irish walking hat, deerstalker and trilby hat are some traditional forms of headwear used in the country. But some people will sometimes choose a non-traditional style of hat, depending on weather conditions, social circumstances and the activity. The flat cap is often made of tweed or cotton, whilst a trilby hat is traditionally made from felt material. For a trilby hat, a feather attached pin on the side is a traditional accessory for both men and women which can also optionally be attached a jacket lapel.

Footwear
Footwear usually depends on the activity in which the wearer is taking part; the weather and conditions underfoot; and the social circumstances. Some of the most common forms of footwear are natural rubber wellington boots and leather country boots which protect the wearer from mud and water on the ground. When wearing a tweed suit, leather brogues are usually a choice of footwear; however, this also depends on the activity or event.

Jackets and coats

English country jackets usually include waxed and quilted jackets. The traditional style is dark olive green with a brown corduroy collar which is based on the original colour palette used when they were first produced, which also included navy as opposed to dark olive green. A gilet is also a popular style of country jacket. Tweed jackets and coats are also worn to protect against weather due to the durability of the material. Fleece jackets and gilets have also become part of country attire in Britain.

Tweed suits and sports jackets
The material tweed has long been associated with the British countryside; when Prince Albert purchased the Balmoral estate he designed the Balmoral tweed long before he laid the first bricks of Balmoral Castle. Tweed uses natural colours to blend into the natural environment; Prince Albert designed the Balmoral Tweed to resemble the granite mountains of Aberdeenshire for stalking. Original country styles include a Norfolk jacket and tweed breeks.

Tweed suits, normally consisting of a jacket, waistcoat and trousers (or skirt) have been an icon of the English country gentleman and lady since the 1840s when Catherine, Lady Dunmore began to provide for the British aristocracy and landed gentry; it soon proved popular as it provided a practical but also smart-casual style. Today tweed suits remain popular, with some choosing the style for business as well as pleasure. However, people very rarely wear the full three piece when outdoors, usually only at events; the suit is traditionally worn with a Tattersall or Gingham shirt and optionally a tie or neck scarf for women. Some also choose to wear a knitwear sweater or jumper for warmth and to remain casual.

Popularity
The popularity of country clothing surges periodically as a result of television period dramas such as Downton Abbey and the earlier All Creatures Great and Small, plus frequent photography releases of celebrities featured wearing the country style. This has included members of the British royal family, such as Queen Elizabeth II and the Prince of Wales, who wear traditional British country clothing when attending racing events and when at royal estates such as Balmoral and Highgrove. The boost in popularity has led to modernized variations of country clothing being produced to attract younger consumers; such designs, such as those by Dolce & Gabbana, have even taken inspiration from Queen Elizabeth II. Other designers, such as Ralph Lauren, have stated their love for country clothing and have based some of their designs on the style. In 2006, retailers in New York reported a boom in demand for the waxed country jacket featured by Dame Helen Mirren in her portrayal of Elizabeth II in The Queen (2006).

In popular culture
English country clothing has featured in many media works, usually when scenes are filmed in the countryside or in an English garden.

Film
The Queen (2006)
What a Girl Wants (2003)

Literature
Elly Griffiths' Ruth Galloway series, especially The Ghost Fields (2014)

Television
Countryfile
Spring, Autumn and Winterwatch
Downton Abbey
Last of the Summer Wine
The Vicar of Dibley
To The Manor Born

All Creatures Great and Small

See also
 Tracht - Worn in Bavaria, Austria and South Tyrol
 Teba jacket - Worn in Great Britain, Spain, France and Austria
 Sloane Ranger

References

Clothing by function
English culture
British culture
British clothing
English clothing